Christopher & Banks is an American retail company. Originally headquartered in the Minneapolis suburb of Plymouth, Minnesota, it specializes in women's clothing for the age 40-60 demographic. In January 2021, the company filed for bankruptcy and closed all stores due to financial loss from the ongoing COVID-19 pandemic. Following the bankruptcy and closures, Christopher & Banks' assets and intellectual property were acquired by Eden Prairie-based iMedia Brands. Since the acquisition, online retail for the company has resumed, as well as five brick-and-mortar locations.

History
The chain was founded in 1956 as Braun's Fashions in Minneapolis. It became a publicly traded company in 1992, and was re-branded as Christopher & Banks in 2000. Also in 2000, the chain founded a second brand, CJ Banks, which is a plus-size clothing store.

In November 2004 Christopher & Banks acquired the Acorn Stores chain and operated it as a third retail concept.  Christopher & Banks announced on July 31, 2008, that they intended to close Acorn and followed through with this plan, closing all 36 Acorn stores by the end of the year.

On April 4, 2005, The Company restated its consolidated statements of income for the fiscal years ended March 1, 2003 and February 28, 2004, as well as for interim periods within the fiscal year ended February 26, 2005, to present the amortization of construction allowances as a reduction of rent expense instead of a reduction of depreciation expense.

In 2014, the company began phasing out CJ Banks stores, and combining the plus-size lines into Christopher & Banks stores. In cases where such stores were adjacent, the stores were combined into one larger store.

In January 2021, the company announced that it filed for bankruptcy and would be closing all stores due to financial loss from the ongoing the COVID-19 pandemic.

Following the bankruptcy, the brand has been relaunched under the ownership of Minnesota-based iMedia Brands. As of January 2022, five locations have been opened, with stores in Coon Rapids, Minnesota, Branson, Missouri, Fort Wayne, Indiana, Greensburg, Pennsylvania, and Canton, Ohio.

References

Companies listed on the New York Stock Exchange
Clothing retailers of the United States
Companies based in Plymouth, Minnesota
American companies established in 1956
American companies disestablished in 2021
Retail companies established in 1956
Retail companies disestablished in 2021
1956 establishments in Minnesota
2021 disestablishments in Minnesota
Companies disestablished due to the COVID-19 pandemic
Companies that filed for Chapter 11 bankruptcy in 2021
Companies that have filed for Chapter 7 bankruptcy